Nikki Seung-hee Lee (이승희, born 1970) is a visual artist born in Geochang, South Korea. Based out of New York City and Seoul, Korea, Lee works professionally in the field of photography and film.

Early life and education 
During her childhood, Lee was exposed to a variety of foreign cultures through the media. She developed an interest in learning about various cultures and its people; however, because she believed it was impossible for a female artist to gain recognition, she was hesitant to pursue a career in art. Lee pursued an acting career instead, but left due to insecurities about her physical appearance. 

Lee earned a Bachelor of Fine Arts in photography at Chung-Ang University in South Korea in 1993. After a year, she moved to New York City to attend the Fashion Institute of Technology to study commercial photography. She subsequently earned her Master of Arts in photography at New York University (NYU) in 1998. At NYU, she became interested in the conceptual aspect of photography. Before her studies there, she mainly worked on documentary projects, which required her to go out to the streets and take photographs; she disliked this aspect of documentary because she did not like "bothering people."

Work
In Lee's early career, she started as a photo assistant for the LaChapelle Studio. She carried lighting, helped set up the studio, and loaded film as an intern. Although she enjoyed working for commercial photography, she wanted to "make something on her own," which propelled her to enter a new career as a photographer.

Projects, 1997–2001

Lee's most noted work, Projects (1997–2001), began as a graduation requirement. Photographs were of herself with many groups of people such as drag queens, punks, swing dancers, senior citizens, Latinos, hip-hop musicians and fans, skateboarders, lesbians, young urban professionals, and schoolgirls. With a simple point-and-shoot camera, she asked others to record her. She immersed herself into each American subculture and created a new self-identity. Lee's work was focused on investigating notions of identity and the uses of vernacular photography, rather than creating beautiful pictures. Lee would select a subculture, research it, and adopt the clothing, customs, and mannerisms of the group to fully integrate herself with the culture. She would try out many culturally diverse types of makeup, hairstyles, dyeing salon, multicolor contact lenses, and dance exercises. After three or more months of developing the identity, Lee would ask a person to take a picture of her with the group. The use of the automatic camera provided Lee with a red timestamp, capturing that moment the person took a picture.

While Lee's projects appear completely unique from one another, there is a common thread among all of the subcultures she portrays. One such is that each of the groups she chose to create an identity has a distinctive look that functions as a connection between the members of their community. Lee's projects highlight her underlying concept of how other people make her a certain kind of person and the influence of inner relationships on the idea of identity.

Lee continues to question the concepts of identity and social behavior; she believes that "essentially life itself is a performance. When we change our clothes to alter our appearance, the real action is the transformation of our way of expression- the outward expression of our psyche." Lee claims that when she shows her work, she prefers presenting several photographs together since they are all connected. The projects support and define one another. Lee's ultimate goal is for the audience to create their own story when they see her work.

To many, The Yuppie Project (1998) is the most significant of Lee's series. Lee immerses herself in the world of Wall Street professionals and whiteness as a race. The Yuppie Project highlights how white people rarely acknowledge the intricate subcultures of their own race by focusing on documenting a small minority of influential men in business settings. Whiteness is represented in two ways; one being the affluence of these young business men and the other being the exclusivity and alienation. In a couple of months of this project, Lee adopts the appearance, body language, and speech pattern of the subcultures to document them in her photographs. Unlike other projects of the series in which Lee is almost indistinguishable from her new clique, Lee stands out in the photographs of The Yuppy Project.

Lee's work in Projects has received criticism of cultural appropriation and blackface.

2002–present
Parts (2002–2005), uses images of Lee posing in different settings with a male partner, cropped to make it impossible to directly see who she is with, leaving only a trace of the man, such as an arm or a foot. This picture sets the focus completely on Lee, which suggests that her identity also changes after each emotional relationship. Lee states that after each photo, her companions state that she looks different than what they thought. With this project, Lee demonstrates the development of an identity that grows and mutates based on the unknown identity of the companion. Parts portray how one of Lee's persona diverges on where she is, how she acts, and how her own identity conforms around the identity of her partner.

In 2006, Lee released the film, A.K.A. Nikki S. Lee. The project, described as a "conceptual documentary", alternates segments presenting Lee as two distinct personalities, one a reserved academic and another an outgoing socialite. It had its premiere at the Museum of Modern Art in New York, October 5–7, 2006. The film appears to be a true Nikki documentary, a young woman who is serious about making a second documentary about herself. Nikki No. 2, an impulsive personality, flaunts in the photo. Lee explained in an interview, "Nikki number one should be Nikki, and Nikki number two should be fake. But both are Nikki fake." Through this work, she aims to point out the interesting concept of showing reality and non-reality at the same time.

During her career, Lee's only work for a commercial magazine was with Black Book. Lee collaborated with the magazine on the theme of bourgeois, creating photographs of herself and her companion as a bourgeois couple.

One of her most recent works is Layers (2008), which is a series of photographs that show layers of the portraits she collected from 14 different cities. Lee would requests street artists to draw her portrait in which she would layer them together underneath a lightbox and take a photo of the mix. The purpose of this project was to find out how people from different cities and ethnicity would view her and describe her features. With this project, Lee asserts that everyone has complex, multilayered personalities, in which any small parts can be viewed by others of different ethnicities.

Since the 1990s, Lee has spoken often about her motivations behind the work. She has emphasized the importance of group identity and social performance in Asia, as opposed to the more personal sense of identity in the US. In an interview with curator RoseLee Goldberg published in 2006, she stated: "Western culture is very much about the individual, while Eastern culture is more about identity in the context of society. You simply cannot think of yourself out of context."

Personal life 
In 2007, Lee married actor Teo Yoo.

Collections 
Lee's work is held in the following permanent collections:
Museum of Contemporary Art, Los Angeles
Museum of Contemporary Photography, Chicago
Hirshhorn Museum and Sculpture Garden, Washington, D.C.
International Center of Photography, New York
Solomon R. Guggenheim Museum, New York
Fukuoka Asian Art Museum, Japan
National Museum of Women in the Arts, Washington, D.C.
Indianapolis Museum of Art, Indianapolis
Kemper Museum of Contemporary Art, Kansas City
University of Michigan Museum of Art, Ann Arbor
Harvard Art Museums, Cambridge
Museum of Fine Arts, Houston
Metropolitan Museum of Art, New York City
San Francisco Museum of Modern Art
Princeton University Art Museum, Princeton

References

External links
Leslie Tonkonow Artworks + Projects, New York
Now in Moving Pictures: The Multitudes of Nikki S. Lee by Carol Kino in The New York Times
Cultural Karaoke by Ben Davis, Artnet Magazine

1970 births
Living people
Fashion Institute of Technology alumni
South Korean emigrants to the United States
South Korean contemporary artists
Chung-Ang University alumni
Tisch School of the Arts alumni
20th-century photographers

South Korean photographers
20th-century American women photographers
20th-century American photographers
21st-century American women photographers
21st-century American photographers
South Korean women photographers